Karen Hartman is a Senior Artist in Residence at University of Washington School of Drama in Seattle. She completed her bachelor's degree in Literature at Yale University and received Master of Fine Arts in Playwriting from Yale School of Drama. Hartman held the Playwright Center's McKnight Residency and Commission for a nationally recognized playwright in 2014 and 2015.

Biography 
Karen grew up in San Diego, California. After graduating from Yale, she moved to New York city. She lived in Brooklyn until 2014, when she became Senior Artist in Residence at the University of Washington School of Drama. She is married to author and educator Todd London, and she has one son, Grisha.

Career 

Karen Hartman's plays have been produced all around the United States, including in New York at the Women's Project, National Asian American Theatre Company, P73, and Summer Play Festival, and regionally at Cincinnati Playhouse, Dallas Theater Center, the Magic, Seattle Repertory Theatre, San Diego Repertory Theatre, Victory Gardens, Theater J, Horizon Theatre, Unicorn Theater, and elsewhere.

Hartman's essays and commentary have been published in the New York Times and the Washington Post. She is the co-founder of national program #TogetherForAbortion, which brings people together for conversations about women's reproductive rights.

Hartman's work has been supported by many foundations, including the Rockefeller Foundation at Bellagio, the National Endowment for the Arts, the Helen Merrill Foundation, and Fulbright Scholarship. Also, she was granted with many awards including Daryl Roth “Creative Spirit” Award and New Dramatists Joseph A. Callaway Award. Moreover, she hold Hodder Fellowship and Jerome Fellowship. Hartman's musical book Sea Change was a finalist for O’Neill Musical Theater Conference, scored by AnnMarie Milazzo. She has been a playwright-in-residence at the Royal National Theatre of Great Britain.

Karen Hartman has four productions of three world premieres in the 2016/17 season: Roz and Ray at Victory Gardens and Seattle Repertory Theater, Book of Joseph, and Project Dawn at People's Light in Malvern, PA.

Musical books 
 The Magic Flute – librettist. Produced by Seattle Meany Theater 
 MotherBone –librettist. Produced by Salvage Vanguard Theater

Plays 
 Gum and The Mother of Modern Censorship –author. Published by Dramatists Play Service, Inc.
 Troy Women –author. Published by Playscripts 
 Girl Under Grain –author. Published by NoPassport Press
 Leah's Train –author. Published by Playscripts.inc 
 Alice: Tales of a Curious Girl (adapted from Lewis Carroll) –author. Published by Playscripts.inc 
 Wild Kate: A Tale of Revenge at Sea (adapted from Moby-Dick) –author. Published by Playscripts.inc 
 Antigone Project –co-author. Published by NoPassport Press 
 New America: Contemporary Literature for a Changing Society –co-author. Published by Autumn House 
 Roz and Ray –author. Produced by Seattle Repertory Theater(2016) and Victory Gardens(2016)
 Project Dawn –author. Produced by Peoples Light 
 The Book of Joseph –author. Produced by Chicago Shakespeare Theater 
 SuperTrue –author. Produced by Know Theatre of Cincinnati 
 Goldie, Max and Milk –author. Produced by Florida Stage Company (2011) and The Phoenix Theater (2011) 
 Going Gone –author. Produced by Cincinnati Playhouse

References 

Year of birth missing (living people)
Living people
American women dramatists and playwrights
21st-century American dramatists and playwrights
Yale School of Drama alumni
21st-century American women writers